Agarak may refer to:

Agarak, Aragatsotn, a village in the eastern part of the Aragatsotn Province, Armenia
Agarak, Lori, a village in the Lori Province, Armenia
Agarak, Syunik, a city in the southern part of the Syunik province, Armenia
Agarak, Syunik (village), a village in the eastern part of the Syunik province, Armenia
Agarakavan,  a village in the central part of the Aragatsotn Province, Armenia